Volley Richa Michelbeke is a Belgian volleyball team from Michelbeke (Brakel). 

The club was founded in 1966 and joined the official Belgian leagues one year later. Richa's first chairman was Belgian politician Herman De Croo. Their women's compartiment was only established six years later, in 1973. They achieved promotion to the highest level of Belgian volleyball for the first time in 2004. Their highest league position ever achieved is 4th, in the 2008-09 season. However, their final ranking was 6th, after the season's playoffs.

2011-12 squad
Coach:  Rutwin Willems
Assistant-Coach:  Astrid Strobbe
Scout:  Emmy De Langhe
Kine:  Marjan Himpe
Kine:  Heleen Van Damme

2012-13 squad
Coach:  Nico De Clercq
Assistant-Coach Scout:  Tom Claes
Kine:  Heleen Van Damme
Kine:  Fabiaan De Couvreur

External links
Official site 

 

Belgian volleyball clubs
Brakel